Beach bunny or beach bunnies may refer to:
Beach bunny (surf culture), term for a young woman who spends her free time at the beach
Umina Beach Bunnies, a rugby league club based on the Central Coast, New South Wales, Australia
Beach Bunny (band), an indie pop band from Chicago

Film
 The Beach Bunnies, 1976 erotic film produced by Stephen C. Apostolof
 Buford's Beach Bunnies, 1993 comedy featuring Jim Hanks

See also

Beach Bunny Bimbos with Blasters, role-playing game by Tri Tac Games
Gidget, a fictional character in several films, television series and telemovies
Buckle bunny, a groupie in the sport of rodeo
Playboy bunny, a waitress at the Playboy Club
Puck bunny, a female ice hockey fan
Snow bunny (disambiguation)
Beach bum (disambiguation)